Bulgaria competed at the 2014 Winter Olympics in Sochi, Russia, from 7 to 23 February 2014. The Bulgarian team consisted of 18 athletes in 6 sports. The team will also consist of 21 officials.

Alpine skiing 

According to the quota allocation released on 30 December 2013, Bulgaria qualified four athletes. The team was officially announced on 20 January 2014.

Biathlon 

Based on their performance at the 2012 and 2013 Biathlon World Championships, Bulgaria qualified 5 men and 1 woman. The team was officially announced on 20 January 2014.

Men

Women

Cross-country skiing 

According to the quota allocation released on 30 December 2013, Bulgaria qualified four athletes. The team was officially announced on 20 January 2014.

Distance

Sprint

Luge 

Bulgaria received a reallocation quota spot in luge.

Ski jumping 

According to the quota allocation released on 30 December 2013, Bulgaria qualified one athlete. The team was officially announced on 20 January 2014.

Snowboarding 

According to the quota allocation released on 30 December 2013, Bulgaria qualified one athlete. The team was officially announced on 20 January 2014. Bulgaria also received a reallocation quota in men's parallel events.

Alpine

Snowboard cross

Qualification legend: FA – Qualify to medal final; FB – Qualify to consolation final

References

External links 
 
 

Nations at the 2014 Winter Olympics
2014
Winter Olympics